Hillgrove Resources is an Australian mining company. Its principal activity has been the Kanmantoo copper mine which was forecast to reach the end of its economic life. Mine life has since been extended, however to a further 6-10 years. Hillgrove also has exploration rights for other prospects in the area, such as extending the Kanmantoo mine underground, and another deposit near Sanderston.

References

mining companies of Australia
Companies based in Adelaide
Companies listed on the Australian Securities Exchange